The 2007–08 Chicago Bulls season was the 42nd season of NBA basketball in Chicago.

Key dates:
 June 28: The 2007 NBA draft took place in New York City.
 July 11: The free agent signing period started.
 October 31: The Bulls' first game of the season against the New Jersey Nets.
 December 24: Scott Skiles was relieved of his duties as the Bulls' head coach.
 December 27: Jim Boylan was named the Bulls' interim head coach for the rest of the season.
 February 21: The Bulls were involved in a three-team trade with the Cleveland Cavaliers and the Seattle SuperSonics that saw Ben Wallace, Joe Smith & Adrian Griffin traded in exchange for four players that included Larry Hughes and Drew Gooden.
 April 16: The Bulls season officially ended with a win against the Raptors. They finished with just 33 wins after being touted as a contender in the Eastern Conference.
 April 17: The Bulls fired interim coach Boylan after a season in which GM John Paxson described as ''disappointing'' and ''disturbing''.

Offseason
The Bulls made the following free agent transactions for the 2007 off-season.

Free agents

Roster

Regular season

Season standings

Record vs. opponents

Game log

|- bgcolor="edbebf"
| 1 || October 31 || @ New Jersey || 103–112 || Gordon (27) || Deng (11) || Duhon (6) ||Izod Center17,342 || 0–1
|-

|- bgcolor="edbebf"
| 2 || November 2 || Philadelphia || 85–96 || Gordon (25) || Thomas (12) || Hinrich (8) ||United Center22,034 || 0–2
|- bgcolor="edbebf"
| 3 || November 3 || @ Milwaukee || 72–78 || Gordon (15) || Smith (10) || Hinrich (4) || Bradley Center18,717  || 0–3
|- bgcolor="edbebf"
| 4 || November 6 || LA Clippers || 91–97 || Deng (22) || Deng (8) || Thomas (5) || United Center21,742 || 0–4
|- bgcolor="bbffbb"
| 5 || November 8 || Detroit || 97–93 || Thomas (19) || Thomas (14) || Hinrich (14) || United Center21,797 || 1–4
|- bgcolor="edbebf"
| 6 || November 10 || Toronto || 71–101 || Nocioni (20) || Sefolosha (6) || Hinrich, Duhon, Sefolosha (4) || United Center22,467 || 1–5
|- bgcolor="edbebf"
| 7 || November 15 || @ Phoenix || 102–112 || Gordon (24) || Wallace (10) || Hinrich (7) || US Airways Center18,422 || 1–6
|- bgcolor="bbffbb"
| 8 || November 17 || @ LA Clippers || 92–73 || Gordon (25) || Wallace (13) || Hinrich, Gordon, Duhon (4) || Staples Center17,535 || 2–6
|- bgcolor="edbebf"
| 9 || November 18 || @ LA Lakers || 78–106 || Gordon (20) || Wallace (8) || Hinrich (8) || Staples Center18,997 || 2–7
|- bgcolor="edbebf"
| 10 || November 20 || @ Denver || 91–112 || Noah (16) || Wallace (12) || Duhon (5) || Pepsi Center17,106  || 2–8
|- bgcolor="edbebf"
| 11 || November 24 || @ New York ||78–85 || Nocioni (23) || Wallace (12) || Hinrich (4) || Madison Square Garden19,763 || 2–9
|- bgcolor="edbebf"
| 12 || November 25 || @ Toronto || 78–93 || Deng (21) || Deng (9) || Hinrich (7) || Air Canada Centre19,800 || 2–10
|- bgcolor="bbffbb"
| 13 || November 27 || Atlanta || 90–78 || Deng (22) || Wallace, Thomas (12) || Duhon (7) || United Center21,826 || 3–10
|-

|- bgcolor="bbffbb"
| 14 || December 1 || Charlotte || 111–95 || Gordon (34) || Wallace (19) || Hinrich (7) || United Center21,729  || 4–10
|- bgcolor="edbebf"
| 15 || December 3 || Dallas || 98–103 || Nocioni (30) || Duhon (9) || Hinrich, Duhon (5)|| United Center21,780 || 4–11
|- bgcolor="bbffbb"
| 16 || December 5 || @ Charlotte || 91–82 || Deng (30) || Nocioni (11) || Duhon (9) || Charlotte Bobcats Arena13,227 || 5–11
|- bgcolor="bbffbb"
| 17 || December 7 || @ Detroit || 98–91 || Nocioni (22) || Smith (14) || Hinrich (6) || Palace of Auburn Hills22,076 || 6–11
|- bgcolor="edbebf"
| 18 || December 8 || Boston || 81–92 || Nocioni (18) || Wallace (14) || Hinrich (6) || United Center22,778 || 6–12
|- bgcolor="bbffbb"
| 19 || December 11 || Seattle || 123–96 || Gordon (27) || Thomas (9) || Hinrich (8) || United Center21,772 || 7–12
|- bgcolor="edbebf"
| 20 || December 12 || @ Indiana || 102–117 || Gordon (27) || Deng (7) || Hinrich (8) || Conseco Fieldhouse10,381 || 7–13
|- bgcolor="bbffbb"
| 21 || December 14 || New York || 101–96 || Deng (29) || Hinrich (12) || Hinrich (14) || United Center21,751 || 8–13
|- bgcolor="edbebf"
| 22 || December 18 || LA Lakers || 91–103 || Deng (26) || Deng, Nocioni (7) || Hinrich (8) || United Center22,310 || 8–14
|- bgcolor="bbffbb"
| 23 || December 19 || @ Washington || 95–84 || Gordon (22) || Gray (10) || Gordon (6) || Verizon Center14,792 || 9–14
|- bgcolor="edbebf"
| 24 || December 21 || @ Boston || 82–107 || Gordon (19) || Thomas (9) || Duhon (4) || TD Banknorth Garden18,624 || 9–15
|- bgcolor="edbebf"
| 25 || December 22 || Houston || 98–116 || Hinrich (22) || Deng (7) || Deng (5) || United Center22,434 || 9–16
|- bgcolor="edbebf"
| 26 || December 26 || @ San Antonio || 79–94 || Smith (19) || Smith (11) || Hinrich (7) || AT&T Center18,797 || 9–17
|- bgcolor="bbffbb"
| 27 || December 28 || Milwaukee || 103–99 || Gordon (31) || Deng, Wallace (10) || Hinrich (9) || United Center22,189 || 10–17
|- bgcolor="bbffbb"
| 28 || December 30 || @ New York || 100–83 || Gordon (25) || Wallace (10) || Hinrich (8) || Madison Square Garden19,763 || 11–17
|- bgcolor="edbebf"
| 29 || December 31 || Orlando || 110–112 || Gordon (39) || Wallace (12) || Hinrich (10) || United Center22,126 || 11–18
|-

|- bgcolor="bbffbb"
| 30 || January 2 || @ Charlotte || 109–97 || Gordon (22) || Deng (13) || Deng (5) || Charlotte Bobcats Arena11,568 || 12–18
|- bgcolor="edbebf"
| 31 || January 3 || Portland || 109–115 || Gordon (32) || Wallace (14) || Hinrich (9) || United Center21,756 || 12–19
|- bgcolor="bbffbb"
| 32 || January 5 || Sacramento || 94–93 || Nocioni (26) || Wallace (11) || Hinrich (7) || United Center21,908 || 13–19
|- bgcolor="edbebf"
| 33 || January 8 || New York || 100–105 || Smith (22) || Smith (12) || Hinrich (9) || United Center21,838 || 13–20
|- bgcolor="bbffbb"
| 34 || January 11 || @ Philadelphia || 100–97 || Nocioni (27) || Wallace (8) || Hinrich (7) || Wachovia Center17,046 || 14–20
|- bgcolor="edbebf"
| 35 || January 13 || @ Atlanta || 84–105 || Deng (28) || Wallace (13) || Duhon, Sefolosha (5) || Philips Arena16,065 || 14–21
|- bgcolor="edbebf"
| 36 || January 15 || @ Orlando || 88–102 || Smith (13) || Noah (11) || Duhon (5) || Amway Arena17,519  || 14–22
|- bgcolor="bbffbb"
| 37 || January 16 || @ Miami || 126–96 || Gordon (24) || Noah (8) || Deng (8) || American Airlines Arena19,600 || 15–22
|- bgcolor="edbebf"
| 38 || January 18 || Golden State || 111–119 || Gordon (29) || Deng (12) || Duhon (8) || United Center21,896 || 15–23
|- bgcolor="bbffbb"
| 39 || January 19 || Detroit || 97–81 || Gordon (33) || Sefolosha (13) || Duhon (4) || United Center22,657 || 16–23
|- bgcolor="edbebf"
| 40 || January 21 || @ Memphis || 90–104 || Gordon (25) || Wallace (13) || Hinrich (6) || FedExForum18,119 || 16–24
|- bgcolor="bbffbb"
| 41 || January 23 || Indiana || 108–95 || Hinrich (38) || Noah (15) || Hinrich (10) || United Center21,774 || 17–24
|- bgcolor="edbebf"
| 42 || January 25 || Charlotte || 77–90 || Nocioni (25) || Sefolosha (10) || Hinrich (8) || United Center21,761 || 17–25
|- bgcolor="edbebf"
| 43 || January 27 || Phoenix || 77–88 || Hinrich (31) || Thomas (11) || Hinrich, Duhon (3) || United Center22,245 || 17–26
|- bgcolor="bbffbb"
| 44 || January 29 || Minnesota || 96–85 || Hinrich (27) || Noah (13) || Hinrich (6) || United Center21,725 || 18–26
|- bgcolor="edbebf"
| 45 || January 30 || @ Minnesota || 67–83 || Hinrich, Sefolosha (14) || Noah, Wallace, Sefolosha (8) || Hinrich (8) || Target Center10,910 || 18–27
|-

|- bgcolor="edbebf"
| 46 || February 2 || @ Sacramento || 101–105 || Gordon (33) || Wallace (9) || Hinrich, Duhon (3) || ARCO Arena15,526  || 18–28
|- bgcolor="bbffbb"
| 47 || February 4 || @ Seattle || 118–108 || Smith (25) || Wallace, Smith (10)|| Wallace (7) || KeyArena10,935 || 19–28
|- bgcolor="edbebf"
| 48 || February 6 || @ Portland || 97–100 || Sefolosha, Nocioni (22) || Wallace (8) || Duhon (9) || Rose Garden20,126 || 19–29
|- bgcolor="bbffbb"
| 49 || February 7 || @ Golden State || 114–108 || Duhon (34) || Noah (10) || Duhon (9) || Oracle Arena19,596 || 20–29
|- bgcolor="edbebf"
| 50 || February 9 || @ Utah || 87–97 || Sefolosha (22) || Sefolosha, Wallace (7) || Duhon (8) || EnergySolutions Arena19,911 || 20–30
|- bgcolor="edbebf"
| 51 || February 12 || New Orleans || 86–100 || Nocioni (28) || Wallace (16) || Duhon (5) || United Center21,739 || 20–31
|- bgcolor="bbffbb"
| 52 || February 14 || Miami || 99–92 || Hinrich (24) || Sefolosha, Thomas (12) || Duhon (8) || United Center21,792 || 21–31
|- bgcolor="edbebf"
| 53 || February 20 || @ New Jersey || 102–110 || Smith (17) || Nocioni, Smith, Wallace (9) || Hinrich (6) || Izod Center15,150 || 21–32
|- bgcolor="bbffbb"
| 54 || February 22 || Denver || 135–121 || Gordon (37) || Thomas (11) || Hinrich (14) || United Center21,848 || 22–32
|- bgcolor="edbebf"
| 55 || February 24 || @ Houston || 97–110 || Thomas (18) || Gooden (8) || Hinrich (10) || Toyota Center18,275 || 22–33
|- bgcolor="edbebf"
| 56 || February 25 || @ Dallas || 94–102 || Gordon (25) || Deng (9) || Gordon (4) || American Airlines Center20,340 || 22–34
|- bgcolor="bbffbb"
| 57 || February 27 || @ Indiana || 113–107 || Hughes (29) || Gooden (15) || Gordon, Hughes (6) || Conseco Fieldhouse10,556 || 23–34
|- bgcolor="edbebf"
| 58 || February 29 || Washington || 91–97 || Nocioni (19) || Deng (11) || Hughes (6) || United Center21,884 || 23–35
|-

|- bgcolor="edbebf"
| 59 || March 2 || @ Cleveland || 86–95 || Hughes (23) || Gooden (10) || Hughes (4) || Quicken Loans Arena20,562 || 23–36
|- bgcolor="bbffbb"
| 60 || March 4 || Memphis || 112–97 || Deng, Gooden (21) || Gooden (14) || Hinrich (12) || United Center21,725 || 24–36
|- bgcolor="bbffbb"
| 61 || March 6 || Cleveland || 107–96 || Deng, Gordon (23) || Noah (20) || Hinrich (7) || United Center22,097 || 25–36
|- bgcolor="edbebf"
| 62 || March 7 || @ Boston || 93–116 || Gordon (20) || Gray (8) || Gordon (4) || TD Banknorth Garden18,624 || 25–37
|- bgcolor="edbebf"
| 63 || March 9 || @ Detroit || 109–116 || Gordon (27) || Gooden (8) || Hughes (5) || Palace of Auburn Hills22,076 || 25–38
|- bgcolor="bbffbb"
| 64 || March 11 || Utah || 108–96 || Gooden (24) || Gooden (10) || Hinrich (6) || United Center21,969 || 26–38
|- bgcolor="edbebf"
| 65 || March 14 || Philadelphia || 106–110 || Deng (21) || Gooden (9) || Hinrich (6) || United Center22,069 || 26–39
|- bgcolor="edbebf"
| 66 || March 17 || @ New Orleans || 97–108 || Gordon (31) || Gooden (12) || Hinrich (5) || New Orleans Arena14,337 || 26–40
|- bgcolor="bbffbb"
| 67 || March 18 || New Jersey || 112–96 || Deng (20) || Gooden (11) || Hinrich (8) || United Center22,070 || 27–40
|- bgcolor="edbebf"
| 68 || March 20 || San Antonio || 80–102 || Deng (18) || Gordon (8) || Gordon (3) || United Center22,353 || 27–41
|- bgcolor="edbebf"
| 69 || March 22 || Indiana || 101–108 || Deng (28) || Gooden, Hughes (10) || Hinrich (10) || United Center21,752 || 27–42
|- bgcolor="bbffbb"
| 70 || March 25 || Atlanta || 103–94 || Gooden (31) || Gooden (16) || Hinrich (10) || United Center21,806  || 28–42
|- bgcolor="edbebf"
| 71 || March 26 || @ Philadelphia || 99–121 || Sefolosha (20) || Gooden (8) || Hinrich (6) || Wachovia Center18,620 || 28–43
|- bgcolor="edbebf"
| 72 || March 28 || @ Atlanta || 103–106 || Deng (19) || Noah (7) || Hinrich (8) || Philips Arena17,223 || 28–44
|- bgcolor="bbffbb"
| 73 || March 29 || Milwaukee || 114–111 || Hughes (19) || Noah (15) || Hinrich (6) || United Center21,983 || 29–44
|-

|- bgcolor="edbebf"
| 74 || April 1 || Boston || 92–106 || Thomas (24) || Noah (8) || Hinrich, Deng (5) || United Center22,225 || 29–45
|- bgcolor="bbffbb"
| 75 || April 3 || @ Cleveland || 101–98 || Hughes (25) || Hughes (8) || Hughes (9) || Quicken Loans Arena20,562 || 30–45
|- bgcolor="edbebf"
| 76 || April 5 || Washington || 87–99 || Gordon (18) || Sefolosha (7) || Gordon (4) || United Center21,929 || 30–46
|- bgcolor="edbebf"
| 77 || April 8 || @ Miami || 88–95 || Deng (25) || Duhon, Hinrich (4) || Noah (13) || American Airlines Arena19,175 || 30–47
|- bgcolor="edbebf"
| 78 || April 9 || @ Orlando || 83–115 || Hinrich (19) || Deng (7) || Hinrich, Sefolosha (4) || Amway Arena17,519 || 30–48
|- bgcolor="bbffbb"
| 79 || April 11 || Cleveland || 100–95 || Deng (21) || Thomas (14) || Hinrich (6) || United Center22,084 || 31–48
|- bgcolor="edbebf"
| 80 || April 13 || Orlando || 84–104 || Nocioni (22) || Deng (7) || Hinrich (7) || United Center21,973 || 31–49
|- bgcolor="bbffbb"
| 81 || April 14 || @ Milwaukee || 151–135 || Deng (32) || Thomas, Sefolosha (8) || Duhon (15) || Bradley Center16,212 || 32–49
|- bgcolor="bbffbb"
| 82 || April 16 || Toronto || 107–97 || Thomas (26) || Gray (22) || Hinrich, Duhon (6) || United Center21,909 || 33–49
|-

Player stats

Regular season 

*Total for entire season including previous team(s)

Awards and records

Records

Milestones

Transactions
The Bulls were involved in the following transactions during the 2007–08 season.

Trades

 ''Players in bold denote former Bulls players.

Free agents

References

Chicago Bulls seasons
Chicago
Chicago
Chicago